Low Heights (in Persian: ارتفاع پست, transliteration: Ertefa'e Past) is a 2002 Iranian thriller film directed by Ebrahim Hatamikia and starring Hamid Farrokhnezhad, Leila Hatami, Amir Aghaei, Reza Shafiee Jam, and Gohar Kheirandish. It was written by Hatamikia and Asghar Farhadi.

Plot
Ghasem (Hamid Farokhnezhad), together with his wife Narges (Leila Hatami), his mother and other relatives, takes a flight to Bandar Abbas, Iran. He seeks to get hired by an industrial company. Since the conditions of work and life are hardly satisfactory, everyone accepts the auspicious invitation. Narges (Leila Hatami) is the only one who knows the true intentions of her husband. Once the plane has taken off and reached its cruising altitude, Ghasem (Hamid Farokhnezhad) brings out a gun, disarms the only flight marshal, threatens the pilot and requires a change of destination to Dubai. During a time in which the attackers are distracted by internal altercations, the second security guard, who till then had been taken for a passenger, leaps at the air pirate and uses the moment of surprise to maneuver him out of his gun. As the plane again takes its way to the planned destination, a new maneuver conducted by Narges (Leila Hatami) succeeds in grabbing the gun and the hijackers once again redirect the plane to Dubai. Short of fuel, the plane ends up crashing into the water in the middle of nowhere.

The story is based on a true event which happened on December 13, 2000, when three members of an extended family of 23 tried to hijack a plane during an Iranian internal flight. Their actions only failed because of the timely reaction of the flight guards. The initial verdicts of death penalty and life imprisonment for the main culprits were later commuted to lengthy prison sentences.

Cast
Hamid Farokhnezhad
Leila Hatami
Gohar Kheirandish
Reza Shafiei Jam
Amir Aghaei
Mehdi Saki
Mohammad Ali Inanlou
Shahram Ghaedi

Sources

External links
 
 

Films directed by Ebrahim Hatamikia
2002 films
Iranian thriller films
Films set on airplanes
2002 action thriller films
Films about terrorism in Asia
Crystal Simorgh for Audience Choice of Best Film winners
Thriller films based on actual events
Films about aircraft hijackings